Torpaq Tappeh (also Romanized as Torpāq Tappeh, Tarpāq Tappeh, Tūrpākh Tappeh, and Turpākh Tepe; also known as Taryāq Tappeh) is a village in Juqin Rural District, in the Central District of Shahriar County, Tehran Province, Iran. At the 2006 census, its population was 586, in 153 families.

References 

Populated places in Shahriar County